The 1963–64 Bradford City A.F.C. season was the 51st in the club's history.

The club finished 5th in Division Four, reached the 1st round of the FA Cup, and the 1st round of the League Cup.

Sources

References

Bradford City A.F.C. seasons
Bradford City